Stumpy may refer to:

As a nickname or stage name:
 Charles Bartlett (American football) (1899–1965), American college football player
 Stumpy Cromer (died 2013), American comedian and dancer, of the Stump and Stumpy entertainment duo (see below)
 Eddie Hartman, the first Stumpy in the Stump and Stumpy dance/comedy/acting duo of the mid-1930s to the 1950s
 Stumpy Malarkey, one of the founders of the Gopher Gang, a New York City street gang
 Steve Thomas (ice hockey) (born 1963), retired National Hockey League player and current assistant coach
 Stumpy Thomason (1906–1989), American National Football League quarterback
 Herb Turner (1921–2002), Australian rules footballer

Entertainment:
 Stumpy (album), released by the New Zealand band Tall Dwarfs in 1996
 Stumpy, a character in the Western Rio Bravo (film), played by Walter Brennan
 a character in Willow and Stumpy, British animated television series

Other uses:
 Stumpy (mascot), official mascot for the 2011 Cricket World Cup
 Common term for the Australian lizard Tiliqua rugosa 

Lists of people by nickname